Terry A. Osborn, Ph.D. is Professor of Education at the University of South Florida and an authority in applied linguistics and interdisciplinary curriculum. He served twice as Interim Chancellor, Vice Chancellor of Academic and Student Affairs, and was previously Dean of the College of Education at the University of South Florida Sarasota-Manatee.  Osborn taught public school for six years.  He was on the faculties of Fordham University, Queens College of City University of New York and the University of Connecticut.

Osborn researches and publishes in the areas of world language education. He was founding co-editor of Critical Inquiry in Language Studies: An International Journal currently published by Routledge.  He is Executive Director of the Florida Association of Colleges for Teacher Education.  He is editor of several academic book series in education.

Osborn has published 16 academic books and more than 40 articles and chapters.  His research has received a number of awards, including the American Educational Studies Association's Critic's Choice Award for his book, Critical Reflection and the Foreign Language Classroom.  Osborn was awarded the Stephen Freeman Award by NECTFL for the best published article on foreign language teaching techniques.  His work on teaching world languages for social justice has been described as seminal in the field.  In 2022, Osborn was awarded the Distinguished Scholar and Lifetime Achievement in Language Studies by the International Society for Language Studies.

Osborn has been a featured expert or keynote speaker in over 29 venues, including The University of Texas, the University of Wisconsin, the University of Florida, the University of Georgia, Istanbul Technical University, Calvin College, Lee University, Rice University, Baylor University, Muhlenberg College, and Seoul National University.

Selected publications

References

1966 births
Living people
University of Connecticut faculty
Fordham University faculty
University of South Florida faculty
American educational theorists